The Phycidae are a family of hakes in the order Gadiformes. They are native to the Atlantic Ocean, but the juveniles of some species enter estuaries.
 Sometimes this family is classified as the subfamily Phycinae of the cod family, Gadidae.

References

External links